True North: Discover Your Authentic Leadership, by Bill George and Peter Sims, is a best-selling 2007 business book and follow-up to George's 2003 Authentic Leadership.  The book—based on interviews between George (a Harvard Business School professor) and over 125 leaders including David Gergen, Starbucks CEO Howard Schultz, and Sir Adrian Cadbury—discusses the qualities and effectiveness of "authentic leadership" and its viability in the business and political worlds.

The book features a foreword by David Gergen discussing the leadership styles of Richard Nixon, Gerald Ford, Ronald Reagan and Bill Clinton.  True North is part of the Warren Bennis series of business books, and is published by Jossey-Bass, an imprint of Wiley publishing.

References

2007 non-fiction books
Business books
Wiley (publisher) books